Trapania maringa is a species of sea slug, a dorid nudibranch, a marine gastropod mollusc in the family Goniodorididae.

Distribution
This species was first described from 14 km. west of Ubatuba, Sao Paulo, Brazil, where it was found amongst algae on the upper shore, in July and September 1955.

Description
This goniodorid nudibranch is translucent white with an irregular network of dark brown pigment just beneath the skin.

The maximum recorded body length is 10 mm.

Ecology
Minimum recorded depth is 0 m. Maximum recorded depth is 0 m.

Trapania maringa probably feeds on Entoprocta which often grow on sponges and other living substrata.

References

Goniodorididae
Gastropods described in 1957
Taxa named by Ernst Marcus (zoologist)